Events from the year 1909 in art.

Events
 February 20 – Filippo Tommaso Marinetti's Futurist Manifesto is first published, in the French newspaper Le Figaro.
 May–June – Claude Monet's Water Lilies series of paintings are first exhibited, at Paul Durand-Ruel's gallery in Paris.
 July 22 – Widowed Irish-born painter John Lavery marries Irish American painter Hazel Martyn.
 Guillaume Apollinaire's first book of poetry is illustrated with woodcuts by André Derain.
 Léon Bakst begins painting scenery for Sergei Diaghilev's Ballets Russes, beginning with Cleopatra.
 Robert Delaunay begins painting his Saint-Sévrin, City and Eiffel Tower series.
 Lithuanian Jewish sculptor Jacques Lipchitz moves to Paris to study and work.
 Pablo Picasso and Georges Braque create the first works of analytical cubism.
 Sonderbund westdeutscher Kunstfreunde und Künstler established in Düsseldorf.
 Kunsthalle Mannheim established as a permanent art gallery.
 Reformation Wall created in Geneva by Swiss architects Charles Dubois, Alphonse Laverrière, Eugène Monod and Jean Taillens with figures by French sculptors Paul Landowski and Henri Bouchard.

 Sergey Prokudin-Gorsky is commissioned by Nicholas II of Russia to begin a record in color photography of his empire.
 Henri Gaudier meets Sophie Brzeska at the Bibliothèque Sainte-Geneviève in Paris.

Works

 Lawrence Alma-Tadema – A Favourite Custom (Tate Britain)
 Giacomo Balla – Street Light
 George Bellows
 Blue Morning
 The Lone Tenement
 Summer Night, Riverside Drive
 Gutzon Borglum – Rabboni (sculpture, Rock Creek Cemetery, Washington, D.C.)
 Antoine Bourdelle – Hercules the Archer (bronze)
 Milly Childers – The Terrace (Palace of Westminster)
 Mikalojus Konstantinas Čiurlionis
 Angels (Paradise)
 Fairy Tale Castle
 Kings' Fairy Tale
 Lightning
 Rural Cemetery
 Cyrus Edwin Dallin – Appeal to the Great Spirit (bronze)
 Charles Fouqueray – La Reconquista de Buenos Aires
 J. W. Godward
 At The Thermae
 A Classical Beauty
 Tympanistria
 Winslow Homer – Right and Left
 John Haberle – Night (New Britain Museum of American Art, New Britain, Connecticut)
 Erich Heckel – Bathers in the Reeds
 Robert Henri – Salome
 Wassily Kandinsky – The Blue Mountain
 Gustav Klimt
 Lady with Hat and Feather Boa
 The Tree of Life (Stoclet Frieze)
 Judith II (Salomé)
 Boris Kustodiev
 Promenade Along the Volga
 Promenade Along the Volga II
 Frances MacDonald – Sleeping Princess
 Ambrose McEvoy – Euphemia
 Jacek Malczewski – At the Source
 Edward Middleton Manigault – The Rocket
 Henri Matisse – Dance (I)
 Edvard Munch – Self-portrait at the Clinic
 Gabriele Münter – Marianne von Werefkin
 Pablo Picasso
 Fruit Dish (Museum of Modern Art, New York)
 Woman with a Fan (Pushkin Museum, Moscow)
 Howard Pyle – Marooned
 Pierre-Auguste Renoir - Claude Renoir in Clown Costume
 Zinaida Serebriakova – At the Dressing-Table: Self-portrait
 Konstantin Somov – Mikhail Kuzmin
 Vardges Sureniants
 Knight-Woman
 Mkrtich Khrimian
 Return of Queen Zabel of Armenia
 Lorado Taft – bronzes
 Eternal Silence (Graceland Cemetery, Chicago)
 Statue of George Washington (University of Washington, Seattle)
 Albert Chevallier Tayler – Elizabeth Barrett Browning - The Anniversary: "I love thee to the level of everyday's most quiet need"
 J. W. Waterhouse – Gather Ye Rosebuds While Ye May

Births

January to June
 January 16 – Clement Greenberg, American art critic (d.1994).
 January 25 – Joseph Solman, American painter (d. 2008).
 February 7 – Wilhelm Freddie, Danish painter and sculptor (d. 1995).
 February 12 – Zoran Mušič, Slovenian- born painter (d. 2005).
 February 17 – Gertrude Abercrombie, American painter (d. 1977).
 February 19 – Enrico Donati, Italian- born American Surrealist painter and sculptor (d. 2008).
 February 26 – Michel Tapié, French artist, critic, curator, and art collector (d. 1987).
 March 8 – H. J. Ward, American illustrator (d. 1945).
 March 13 – Reynolds Stone, English wood engraver (d. 1979).
 March 22 – Milt Kahl, American animator (d. 1987).
 April 3 – Graham Stuart Thomas, English horticultural artist, author and garden designer (d. 2003).
 April 30 – F. E. McWilliam, Irish sculptor (d. 1992).
 May 17 – Giulio Carlo Argan, Italian art historian and politician (d. 1992).
 June 14 – Ettore DeGrazia, American impressionist, painter, sculptor and lithographer (d. 1982).
 June 26 – Wolfgang Reitherman, German-American animator (d. 1985).

July to December
 July 13 – Marie-Thérèse Walter, mistress of Pablo Picasso (d. 1977).
 September 14 – Peter Scott, English ornithologist, conservationist, painter (d. 1989).
 September 23 – Marianne Straub, Swiss-born British textile designer (d. 1994).
 September 28 – Al Capp, cartoonist (d. 1979).
 October 13 – Herblock, political cartoonist (d. 2001).
 October 19 – Marguerite Perey, French physicist and academic (d. 1975)
 October 28 – Francis Bacon, Irish-born British figurative painter (d. 1992).
 November 5 – Milena Pavlović-Barili, Serbian painter and poet (d. 1945).
 November 6 – Herman Rose (Herman Rappaport), American painter (d. 2007).
 December 25 – Philip Zec, British political cartoonist (d. 1983).

Full date unknown
 Gabriel Hayes, Irish sculptor and coin designer (d. 1978).

Deaths
 January 9 – Paul Gachet, French physician to artists, Impressionist art collector and amateur painter (b. 1828)
 February 11 – Russell Sturgis, American architect and art critic (b. 1836)
 February 20 – Paul Ranson, French painter and writer (b. 1864)
 February 26 – Caran d'Ache, French political cartoonist (b. 1858)
 April 20 – Hélène Bertaux, French sculptor and women's rights activist (b. 1825)
 June 22 – Edward John Gregory, English painter (b. 1850)
 August 23 – Adolf von Becker, Finnish painter (b. 1831)
 November 9 – William Powell Frith, English genre painter (b. 1819)
 November 21 – Peder Severin Krøyer, Norwegian painter (b. 1851)
 November 23 – Otto Sinding, Norwegian painter (b. 1842)
 November 25 – Cyprian Godebski, Polish sculptor and teacher (b. 1835)

References

 
Years of the 20th century in art
1900s in art